is a Japanese voice actor. He is affiliated with Ken Production. He is originally from Kyoto Prefecture.

Filmography

Television animation
Buddy Complex, Don Naher
Le Chevalier D'Eon, Count Cagliostro
Lucky Star, Kiyotaka Narumi
Hanbun no Tsuki ga Noboru Sora, Tsukasa Sekoguchi
Hyōka, Quiz Study Group President
Rockman EXE Beast, SherbetMan (ep. 9), Announcement (ep. 12)
Sword Art Online, Tecchi
The Melancholy of Haruhi Suzumiya, Computer Research Society President
The Story of Saiunkoku, Official Wa
To Your Eternity, Uroy
Transformers: Micron Legend, Jim, Stepper
Shirobako, Gōtarō Katsuragi

Original video animation (OVA)
I"s Pure, Yasumasa Teratani

Video games
Legend of Zelda: Skyward Sword

Dubbing
Cellular, Chad (Eric Christian Olsen)
Cyrus, Cyrus Fawcett (Jonah Hill)
Unaccompanied Minors, Timothy "Beef" Wellington (Brett Kelly)

References

External links

Maeda, Hisashi. "The Official Art of The Melancholy of Haruhi Suzumiya". (November 2007) Newtype USA. pp. 133–139

Japanese male voice actors
Male voice actors from Kyoto Prefecture
1974 births
Living people
21st-century Japanese male actors
Ken Production voice actors